Craig Francis Albernaz (born October 30, 1982) is an American professional baseball  bullpen and catching coach for the San Francisco Giants of Major League Baseball (MLB). He played college baseball for Eckerd College. Albernaz signed with the Tampa Bay Rays as a free agent in 2006.

High school, college, and playing career
Albernaz attended Somerset Berkley Regional High School in Somerset, Massachusetts. He attended Eckerd College, where he played college baseball as a pitcher and catcher. He graduated from Eckerd in 2005. 

Albernaz was undrafted out of college and signed with the Tampa Bay Rays as a free agent in 2006. He played as a catcher in the Rays organization from 2006 through 2013. He spent his final season in 2014 in the Detroit Tigers organization.

Coaching career
Albernaz began his coaching career in 2015. He served as a coach for the Princeton Rays in the Appalachian League in 2015 and for the Hudson Valley Renegades in the New York-Penn League in 2016. He started the 2017 season as the third base and catching coach of the Durham Bulls in the International League, before serving as the manager of Hudson Valley. He served as the Bowling Green Hot Rods manager in the Midwest League in 2018. He was named the 2018 Midwest League Manager of the Year. Albernaz spent the 2019 season as one of the Rays minor league field coordinators. 

On December 11, 2019, Albernaz was hired by the San Francisco Giants as their bullpen and catching coach.

References

External links

1982 births
Living people
Sportspeople from Fall River, Massachusetts
Baseball coaches from Massachusetts
Baseball players from Massachusetts
Baseball catchers
Baseball pitchers
Major League Baseball bullpen coaches
San Francisco Giants coaches
Eckerd Tritons baseball players
Princeton Devil Rays players
Columbus Catfish players
Vero Beach Devil Rays players
Montgomery Biscuits players
Durham Bulls players
Erie SeaWolves players
Minor league baseball coaches
Minor league baseball managers
Eckerd College alumni